A backwater valve is a backflow prevention device used to prevent outbound water through a dwelling's drain pipes from re-entering -- "back flowing"—into a home. The valve contains a flap that allows water to exit the home, but closes to prevent  the back flow into the home.

Backwater valves commonly activate when a city's sewer lines are unable to handle a large amount of falling precipitation; this puts homes that are tied into the storm lines at risk of having water back flow into them.

There is a big difference between backwater valves and backflow preventers:

 A backwater valve prevents raw sewage from backing up into your home through your toilets, showers, etc.
 A backflow preventer deals with protecting a potable water source from being contaminated by a reverse flow of foul water (ex: isolating your toilet's flush cistern and water supply from the toilet bowl water itself).

See also 
 Check valve

References

Plumbing valves
Water
Sanitation
Backflow